George Jameson may refer to:
 George Jamesone, or Jameson, Scottish painter
 George Jameson (RNZAF officer), New Zealand flying ace